Below is a list of squads used in the 2006 African Nations Cup.

Group A

Egypt
Coach:  Hassan Shehata

Libya
Coach:  Ilija Lončarević

Morocco
Coach:  Mohamed Fakhir

Ivory Coast
Coach:  Henri Michel

Group B

Cameroon
Coach:  Artur Jorge

Angola
Coach:  Oliveira Gonçalves

Togo
Coach:  Stephen Keshi

DR Congo
Coach:  Claude Le Roy

Group C

Tunisia
Coach:  Roger Lemerre

Zambia
Coach:  Kalusha Bwalya

South Africa
Coach:  Ted Dumitru

Guinea
Coach:  Patrice Neveu

Group D

Nigeria
Coach:  Augustine Eguavoen

Ghana
Coach:  Ratomir Dujkovic

Zimbabwe
Coach:  Charles Mhlauri

Senegal
Coach:  Abdoulaye Sarr

External links
Squads (BBC)
ALL ABOUT EGYPTIAN PLAYERS

Africa Cup of Nations squads